White Russian Americans may refer to:

 Belarusian Americans
 White émigrés, Russian subjects who emigrated for political reasons during the 20th century

See also 
 White Russian (disambiguation)
 Russian Americans